Kwon Yul (1537–1599) was a Korean Army General of the Joseon Dynasty.

Kwon Yul may also refer to:
Yul Kwon (born 1975), winner of the reality TV show Survivor: Cook Islands in 2006
Kwon Yul (actor) (born 1982), South Korean actor